In electronics, high impedance means that a point in a circuit (a node) allows a relatively small amount of current through, per unit of applied voltage at that point. High impedance circuits are low current and potentially high voltage, whereas low impedance circuits are the opposite (low voltage and potentially high current). Numerical definitions of "high impedance" vary by application.

High impedance inputs are preferred on measuring instruments such as voltmeters or oscilloscopes. In audio systems, a high-impedance input may be required for use with devices such as crystal microphones or other devices with high internal impedance.

Analog electronics
In analog circuits a high impedance node is one that does not have any low impedance paths to any other nodes in the frequency range being considered. Since the terms low and high depend on context to some extent, it is possible in principle for some high impedance nodes to be described as low impedance in one context, and high impedance in another; so the node (perhaps a signal source or amplifier input) has relatively low currents for the voltages involved.

High impedance nodes have higher thermal noise voltages and are more prone to capacitive and inductive noise pick up. When testing, they are often difficult to probe as the impedance of an oscilloscope or multimeter can heavily affect the signal or voltage on the node. High impedance signal outputs are characteristic of some transducers (such as crystal pickups); they require a very high impedance load from the amplifier to which they are connected. Vacuum tube amplifiers, and field effect transistors more easily supply high-impedance inputs than bipolar junction transistor-based amplifiers, although current buffer circuits or step-down transformers can match a high-impedance input source to a low impedance amplifier.

Digital electronics

In digital circuits, a high impedance (also known as hi-Z, tri-stated, or floating) output is not being driven to any defined logic level by the output circuit. The signal is neither driven to a logical high nor low level; this third condition leads to the description "tri-stated". Such a signal can be seen as an open circuit (or "floating" wire) because connecting it to a low impedance circuit will not affect that circuit; it will instead itself be pulled to the same voltage as the actively driven output. The combined input/output pins found on many ICs are actually tri-state capable outputs which have been internally connected to inputs (resulting in three-state logic or four-valued logic).  This is the basis for bus-systems in computers, among many other uses.

The high-impedance state of a given node in a circuit cannot be verified by a voltage measurement alone. A pull-up resistor (or pull-down resistor) can be used as a medium-impedance source to try to pull the wire to a high (or low) voltage level. If the node is not in a high-impedance state, extra current from the resistor will not significantly affect its voltage level.

References

Digital circuits